In architecture, a long gallery is a long, narrow room, often with a high ceiling.  In Britain, long galleries were popular in Elizabethan and Jacobean houses.  They were normally placed on the highest reception floor of English country houses, usually running along a side of the house, with windows on one side and at the ends giving views, and doors to other rooms on the other.  They served several purposes: they were used for entertaining guests, for taking exercise in the form of walking when the weather was inclement, for displaying art collections, especially portraits of the family and royalty, and acting as a corridor.

A long gallery has the appearance of a spacious corridor, but it was designed as a room to be used in its own right, not just as a means of passing from one room to another, though many served as this too. In the 16th century, the seemingly obvious concept of the corridor had not been introduced to British domestic architecture; rooms were entered from outside or by passing from one room to another.

Later, long galleries were built, sometimes in a revivalist spirit, as at Harlaxton Manor, an extravagant early-Victorian house in Jacobean style, and sometimes to house a large art collection, as at Buckingham Palace, which has a long interior space lit from above, called the Picture Gallery.

Examples

Notable long galleries in the United Kingdom can be seen at:
 Althorp, Northamptonshire
 Apethorpe Hall, Northamptonshire
 Aston Hall, Birmingham 
Astley Hall, Chorley
 Blickling Hall, Norfolk
 Burghley House, near Stamford, Lincolnshire
 Broughton Castle, Oxfordshire
 Burton Agnes Hall, Yorkshire
 Burton Constable Hall, Yorkshire
 Castle Ashby House, Northamptonshire, now 18th-century in style.
 Charlton House, London
 Croome Court, Worcestershire, Adam interior
 Haddon Hall, Derbyshire
 Ham House, London – compact and running from front to rear
 Hardwick Hall, Derbyshire – one of the largest
 Harewood House
 Harlaxton Manor,
 Hatfield House, Hertfordshire
 Little Moreton Hall, Cheshire
 Longleat House, Wiltshire – the long gallery is now called the Saloon
 Lyme Park, Cheshire
 Montacute House, Somerset
 Osterley Park, London
 Scone Palace, Perthshire
 Sudbury Hall, Derbyshire
 Syon House, London
 Temple Newsam House, Yorkshire – Jacobean long gallery, later modified and now called the picture gallery
 Welbeck Abbey
 Windsor Castle – Elizabethan long gallery; later converted by William IV, along with adjacent rooms, to house the Royal Library

References

Further reading 
 The 'Long Gallery': Its Origins, Development, Use and Decoration by Rosalys Coope in Architectural History, Vol. 29, 1986 (1986), pp. 43–72+74-84
 

Architectural elements
Rooms
Architecture in England